Thomas Muster was the defending champion and won in the final 7–6(7–3), 6–2 against Jiří Novák.

Seeds

  Thomas Muster (champion)
  Andrea Gaudenzi (quarterfinals)
  Jiří Novák (final)
  Javier Frana (quarterfinals)
  Francisco Clavet (semifinals)
  Javier Sánchez (quarterfinals)
  Fernando Meligeni (semifinals)
  Félix Mantilla (second round)

Draw

Finals

Top half

Bottom half

References
 1996 Abierto Mexicano de Tenis Draw

1996 ATP Tour